The 2000–01 Ohio Bobcats men's basketball team represented Ohio University in the college basketball season of 2000–01. The team was coached by Larry Hunter in his 12th and final season at Ohio and played their home games at the Convocation Center.  Hunter was terminated after the season for a lack of postseason success.

Roster

Preseason
The preseason poll was announced by the league office on October 4, 2000.  Ohio was picked fifth in the MAC East.

Preseason men's basketball poll
(First place votes in parenthesis)

East Division
  (29) 265 
  (11) 229 
  174
  165
 Ohio 144
  100
  43

West Division
  (20) 219
  (19) 213
  (1) 133
 Eastern Michigan 122
  79
  74

Tournament champs
Marshall (14), Ball State (10), Kent State (7), Toledo (6), Bowling Green (1), Miami (1), Central Michigan (1)

Schedule and results
Source:   

|-
!colspan=9 style=| Regular Season

|-
!colspan=9 style=| MAC Tournament

|-

Statistics

Team Statistics
Final 2000–01 Statistics

Source

Player statistics

Source

Awards and honors

All-MAC Awards 

Source

References

Ohio Bobcats men's basketball seasons
Ohio
Bob
Bob